Protix is a multinational manufacturer and supplier of insect ingredients for animal feed and for human consumption. The company operates the world's largest insect factory, located in Bergen op Zoom in the Netherlands.

History
The company was founded in 2009 by the CEO Kees Aarts. Protix is headquartered in Dongen, Netherlands.

In June 2017, the company raised €45 million in funding, at that time the largest investment in the industry. In October 2017, Protix acquired Fair Insects, a company focused on breeding insects for human consumption.

In June 2019, Protix opened a new site in Bergen op Zoom, which is the largest insect factory in the world.

References

External links
 

Food and drink companies established in 2009
Multinational companies headquartered in the Netherlands
Insect farming companies
Animal food manufacturers
Agriculture companies established in 2009
Dutch companies established in 2009